The term "eye of a needle" is used as a metaphor for a very narrow opening. It occurs several times throughout the Talmud. The New Testament quotes Jesus as saying in Luke 18:25 that "it is easier for a camel to go through the eye of a needle than for a rich man to enter the kingdom of God" (Jesus and the rich young man). It also appears in the Qur'an 7:40, "Indeed, those who deny Our verses and are arrogant toward them – the gates of Heaven will not be opened for them, nor will they enter Paradise until a camel enters into the eye of a needle. And thus do We recompense the criminals."

Aphorisms

Judaism
The Babylonian Talmud applies the aphorism to unthinkable thoughts. To explain that dreams reveal the thoughts of a man's heart and are the product of reason rather than the absence of it, some rabbis say:

A midrash on the Song of Songs uses the phrase to speak of God's willingness and ability beyond comparison to accomplish the salvation of a sinner:

Rav Sheishet of Nehardea applied the same aphorism to the convoluted reasoning for which the sages of Pumbedita were evidently famous: "Are you from Pumbedita, where they push an elephant through the eye of a needle?" (Baba Metzia, 38b).

Christianity

"The eye of a needle" is a portion of a quotation attributed to Jesus in the synoptic gospels:

The saying was a response to a young rich man who had asked Jesus what he needed to do to inherit eternal life. Jesus replied that he should keep the commandments, which the man replied that he had done so. Jesus responded, "If you want to be perfect, go, sell your possessions and give to the poor, and you will have treasure in heaven. Then come, follow me." The young man became sad and was unwilling to do that. Jesus then spoke that response, leaving his disciples astonished.

More recently, George Lamsa, in his 1933 translation of the Bible into English from the Syriac, claimed the same.

Arthur Schopenhauer, in The World as Will and Representation, Volume 1, § 68, quoted Matthew 19:24: "It is easier for an anchor cable to go through an eye of a needle than for a rich person to come to God's kingdom."

In modern times, the scripture has been used as a counterargument to the prosperity gospel, the belief that accruing wealth is a virtue favored by God.

Gate
The "Eye of the Needle" has been claimed to be a gate in Jerusalem, which opened after the main gate was closed at night. A camel could not pass through the smaller gate unless it was stooped and had its baggage removed. The story has been put forth since at least the 11th century and possibly as far back as the 9th century. However, there is no widely accepted evidence for the existence of such a gate.

Islam
According to the English interpretation of the Quran:

The camel, in Arabic , can also be translated as "twisted rope".

See also

 Christian views on poverty and wealth
 Epistle of James, 5:1-6
 Eyelet
 Matthew 7:13, about the broad gate and the narrow gate
 Simple living

Notes

References

External links
 "What's the meaning of Jesus' teaching about the camel going through the eye of a needle?" from The Straight Dope

Doctrines and teachings of Jesus
Biblical phrases
Sewing
Metaphors referring to objects
Metaphors referring to animals
Quranic words and phrases
Animals in the Bible